Thoburn is a surname. Notable people with the surname include:

People
Crawford R. Thoburn (1862–1899), American Methodist minister
Isabella Thoburn (1840–1901), American Christian missionary of the Methodist Episcopal Church in North India
James Mills Thoburn (1836–1922), American bishop of the Methodist Episcopal Church known for his missionary work in India
Joseph Thoburn (1825–1864), officer and brigade commander in the Union Army during the American Civil War
Joseph Bradfield Thoburn (1866–1941), Oklahoma historian, long-time Director of Oklahoma Historical Society
June Thoburn (born 1939), English academic
Robert L. Thoburn (1929–2012), American state legislator and writer. Also founded the Fairfax Christian School
William Thoburn (politician) (1847–1928), Canadian woollen manufacturer and politician in the province of Ontario
William Thoburn (rower) (1906–1997), Canadian rower who competed in the 1932 Summer Olympics

See also
Thoburn v Sunderland City Council, important English constitutional law case
Thorburn
Thulborn
Thurber (disambiguation)
Torbjörn
Turbin